There are numerous war museums, memorials and monuments in Vietnam, this page presents a partial list of museums and monuments located in Vietnam relating to the First Indochina War and the Second Indochina War. This list is organized by location.

Ap Bac
A small museum in the hamlet of Ap Bac commemorates the Battle of Ap Bac in January 1963. A monument shows Viet Cong forces shooting down helicopters and destroying armoured vehicles. Items on display include an M101 howitzer, M113 armoured personnel carrier and a UH-1H Huey.

Ben Hai river
A peace and unification monument stands on the north side of the Ben Hai River which formed the eastern end of the Vietnamese Demilitarized Zone.

Bien Hoa
A monument on Highway 1 adjacent to the main gate for Bien Hoa Air Base commemorates the People's Army of Vietnam seizing of the Air Base on 25 April 1975.

The Bien Hoa Museum is located on Highway 1, adjacent to the Bien Hoa Air Base. Items on display include a 57 mm AZP S-60 antiaircraft gun, M1939 37mm antiaircraft gun, M-46 130mm cannon, M113 armoured personnel carrier, MiG-21, T-59 tank and Bell UH-1H.

Camp Carroll
Camp Carroll

Côn Sơn Island
Côn Sơn Island

Cu Chi
Củ Chi tunnels

Dak To
In the middle of town is a war memorial commemorating the capture of Dak To on 24 April 1972 during the Easter Offensive, together with a T-54 tank and a ZSU-57-2 anti-aircraft gun.

Danang
Zone 5 Military Museum, Danang

Dien Bien Phu
Monuments are located on all major sites of the Battle of Dien Bien Phu, including:
The bunker of General Christian de Castries.
Military museum with assorted weaponry used by the French colonial forces and the Viet Minh.
The French hill strongpoints all have Viet Minh monuments.
French memorial to approximately 10,000 French colonial troops who died in the battle and in captivity
Two large Viet Minh cemeteries, one in the center of town adjacent to strongpoint Eliane 2 and the other north of the town adjacent to strongpoint Gabrielle

Hanoi
"B-52 lake", Hồ B-52 or May Bay B52 is located just south of the West Lake along Hoang Hoa Tham Rd, more a rather large pond it contains wreckage of a B-52 Stratofortress shot down on 27 December 1972 during Operation Linebacker II

B-52 Victory Museum, Hanoi
Hanoi Hilton
Vietnam Military History Museum
Vietnamese People's Air Force Museum, Hanoi
Vietnam War Memorial, Hanoi

Hội An
A large PAVN cemetery is located on Le Hong Phong just north of Hội An.
A PAVN cemetery is located on Nguyen Hoang, north of Hoi An.
The Hội An Museum has several rooms featuring the history of Hội An during the First Indochina War and the Vietnam War

Huế
The Huế War Museum (Vietnamese: Bảo tàng Cách mạng Thừa Thiên Huế) is located on Hai Mươi Ba Tháng Tám, inside the Citadel. Items on display include an M42 Duster, M48 Patton tank, M88 Recovery Vehicle, M113 armoured personnel carrier, Cadillac Gage V-100 Commando armoured car and M107 Self-Propelled Gun. Inside the museum are various small arms and the PAVN version of the Battle of Huế, the Massacre at Huế is not mentioned.

Khe Sanh
There is a small museum on the site of the old Khe Sanh Combat Base. Items on display include a Bell UH-1H Huey, Boeing CH-47 Chinook, M41 Walker Bulldog tank and artillery pieces. On display in the museum are various small arms together with photos from the battles around Khe Sanh and also Operation Lam Son 719.

Lang Vei
A PT-76 light amphibious tank sits on a pedestal adjacent to Highway 9 to commemorate the PAVN victory in the Battle of Lang Vei.

Long Binh/ Thu Duc
A large PAVN cemetery is located on Highway 1 between Saigon and Bien Hoa. It contains the graves of PAVN soldiers killed during the Ho Chi Minh Campaign and during the Cambodian–Vietnamese War.
Bình An Cemetery, the former ARVN National Cemetery is located near the PAVN Cemetery.

Long Tan/Long Thành
A cross in a rubber plantation serves as a memorial for the Australian and Vietnamese dead in the Battle of Long Tan. This is one of the few memorials to Free World troops in Vietnam as most monuments in South Vietnam were destroyed following the North Vietnamese victory in 1975. The monument is a replica of the original Long Tan Cross, which was erected by Australian forces in 1969.

A PAVN Cemetery is located on Route 51

Mang Yang
On Route 19 between the villages of An Thanh (west of An Khe) and Ha Ra (east of Pleiku) is the location of the Battle of Mang Yang Pass. A French cemetery is located off Route 19.

My Tho/Vinh Long
Military museum of My Tho. Items on display include an A-37 Dragonfly, F-5A Freedom Fighter, M41 Walker Bulldog tank, UH-1H Huey.

Phan Thiet
Military museum is located on Hai Thuong Lan Hong. Items on display include M101 howitzer, M107 Self-Propelled Gun, UH-1H Huey

Phu Loi
The Phu Loi Prison for Viet Minh prisoners and later opponents of the Ngo Dinh Diem government is now a museum.(). Little remains of the airfield built by the Japanese in the Second World War and subsequently used by U.S. Army aviation units during the Vietnam War.

Saigon
 Ho Chi Minh Campaign Museum is located at 2 Le Duan Boulevard, District 1 in central Saigon. It commemorates the Ho Chi Minh Campaign that led to the fall of South Vietnam. Items on display include a 57 mm AZP S-60 antiaircraft gun, F-5A Freedom Fighter, M-46 130mm cannon, M113 armoured personnel carrier, SA-2 Guideline SAM, T-54 tank, ZIL-157 truck
 Ho Chi Minh City Museum. Items on display include an A-37 Dragonfly, F-5A Freedom Fighter, M41 Walker Bulldog tank, UH-1H Huey.

 Southeastern Armed Forces Museum Military Zone 7
Reunification Palace
Former US Embassy, Saigon Tet Offensive memorials. A memorial on Le Duan Boulevard commemorates the members of the Vietcong C-10 Sapper Battalion who blew a hole in the wall of the US Embassy and gained access to the Embassy grounds on the morning of 31 January 1968. Inside the grounds of the now US Consulate is a plaque commemorating the US Marine guard and the 4 MPs who were killed defending the Embassy, the plaque is a replacement for the original which was left at the Embassy during the Fall of Saigon and was subsequently on display at the War Remnants Museum before disappearing.

Vietnamese People's Air Force Museum, Saigon
War Remnants Museum

Tay Ninh
The Tay Ninh Museum on 30 Thang 4 has various weaponry and wreckage.
An outdoor museum on Route 792 has an M41 Walker Bulldog tank, Cadillac Gage V-100 Commando armoured car and M113 armoured personnel carrier.

Truong Son Cemetery
The Trường Sơn Cemetery or Nghĩa trang liệt sĩ Trường Sơn is located on Highway 15 near the village of Ben Tat, northwest of Dong Ha. It contains the graves of PAVN soldiers killed on the DMZ and on the Ho Chi Minh Trail.

Vinh Moc
Vinh Moc tunnels

Vung Tau
A PAVN memorial is located on a traffic island on Le Hong Phong, in central Vung Tau.

Xuan Loc
A monument on Highway 1 commemorates the eventual People's Army of Vietnam victory in the Battle of Xuân Lộc.

A PAVN cemetery contains the graves of North Vietnamese troops killed in the Battle of Xuân Lộc.

See also
List of museums in Vietnam

References

External links 
Hanoi Military Museum website
Ho Chi Minh City Department of Tourism
Ray's Map Room
Saigon Facilities Map, 1969

First Indochina War
Indochina Wars
Vietnam
Military and war museums in Vietnam
Museums in Vietnam
Sino-Vietnamese War
Tourism in Vietnam
Vietnam War memorials
Vietnam War sites
Vietnam War museums
War museums and monuments in Vietnam
Lists of museums in Asia